Semra, also spelled Simra, is a village in Chinhat block of Lucknow district, Uttar Pradesh, India. It is part of Lucknow tehsil. As of 2011, its population is 1,816, in 359 households. It is the seat of a gram panchayat.

References 

Villages in Lucknow district